A liquid dielectric is a dielectric material in liquid state. Its main purpose is to prevent or rapidly quench electric discharges. Dielectric liquids are used as electrical insulators in high voltage applications, e.g. transformers, capacitors, high voltage cables, and switchgear (namely high voltage switchgear). Its function is to provide electrical insulation, suppress corona and arcing, and to serve as a coolant.

A good liquid dielectric should have high dielectric strength, high thermal stability and inertness against the construction materials used, non-flammability and low toxicity, good heat transfer properties, and low cost.

Liquid dielectrics are self-healing; when an electric breakdown occurs, the discharge channel does not leave a permanent conductive trace in the fluid.

The electrical properties tend to be strongly influenced by dissolved gases (e.g. oxygen or carbon dioxide), dust, fibers, and especially ionic impurities and moisture. Electrical discharge may cause production of impurities degrading the dielectric's performance.

Some examples of dielectric liquids are transformer oil, perfluoroalkanes, and purified water.

See also
Dielectric gas

References